Besida is a journal edited by Petro Trochanowski in Krynica, Poland.  It is known as a source of information about the Lemko people.

References

1989 establishments in Poland
Magazines established in 1989
Quarterly magazines
Polish-language magazines
Literary magazines published in Poland